Lamovje (in older sources Lomovje) is a former settlement in the Municipality of Litija in central Slovenia. It is now part of the village of Sopota. The area is part of the traditional region of Lower Carniola and is now included with the rest of the municipality in the Central Sava Statistical Region.

Geography
Lamovje stands in the eastern part of Sopota, on a small road branching off of the local road from Sopota to Jagnjenica.

Name
Lamovje was attested in historical sources as Lumbay  1420 and as Lumba in 1499.

History
Lamovje had a population of 12 living in one house in 1900. Lamovje was annexed by Dobovica in 1952, ending its existence as a separate settlement. When Sopota became a separate settlement in 1995, Lamovje was assigned to its territory.

References

External links
Lamovje on Geopedia

Populated places in the Municipality of Litija